Ratchasan is a district (amphoe) in the central part of Chachoengsao province, central Thailand.

History
The area of Ratchasan was separated from Phanom Sarakham district and became a minor district (king amphoe) on 16 February 1977. It was upgraded to a full district on 4 July 1994.

Geography
Neighboring districts are (from the east clockwise): Phanom Sarakham, Plaeng Yao, and Bang Khla of Chachoengsao Province; and Ban Sang of Prachinburi province.

The important water resource is the Khlong Tha Lat.

Administration

Central administration 
Ratchasan is divided into three sub-districts (tambons), which are further subdivided into 31 administrative villages (mubans).

Local administration 
There are three sub-district administrative organizations (SAO) in the district:
 Bang Kha consisting of sub-district Bang Kha.
 Mueang Mai consisting of sub-district Mueang Mai.
 Dong Noi consisting of sub-district Dong Noi.

References

External links
amphoe.com

Ratchasan